Power Chords is the fourth studio album by American singer-songwriter Mike Krol. It was released on January 25, 2019 through Merge Records.

Track listing

References

2019 albums
Merge Records albums